Princess Hexiao of the First Rank (2 February 1775 – 13 October 1823), personal name unknown, was a Manchu princess of the Qing dynasty. She was the tenth and youngest daughter of the Qianlong Emperor. Her mother was Consort Dun.

Birth and childhood
Gurun Princess Hexiao was born in 1775 when the Qianlong Emperor was already 63 years old. At the time of her birth, nearly all of the Qianlong Emperor's other daughters, including Gurun Princess Hejing (固倫和敬公主) and Heshuo Princess Heke (和碩和恪公主), had either died or married and left the palace. The Qianlong Emperor was thus overjoyed when he heard news of the birth of another daughter. Gurun Princess Hexiao was deeply favoured by her father from birth. Throughout her childhood, ministers and courtiers remarked that the Tenth Princess – as she was commonly referred to – resembled her father in appearance. She was said to be resolute in character, and frequently accompanied the Qianlong Emperor on hunting excursions.

Going against tradition, the Qianlong Emperor elevated his tenth daughter from the status of a "Heshuo Princess" (the rank usually accorded to a princess born to a consort below the rank of Empress) to a "Gurun Princess" (the rank of a princess born to the Empress). Therefore, the Tenth Princess became known by her title "Gurun Princess Hexiao".

Marriage
On 12 January 1790, she married Fengšeninde (豐紳殷德; 1775–1810) of the Niohuru clan, a prominent Manchu clan. Fengšeninde was the eldest son of Heshen, an official highly favoured by the Qianlong Emperor. Gurun Princess Hexiao's dowry of 300,000 silver taels far exceeded that of any other of the Qianlong Emperor's daughters. Gurun Princess Hexiao and Fengšeninde had a son, who was born sometime between 1794 and 1796, but died young in 1798.

Heshen's fall from power
In 1799, shortly after the Qianlong Emperor's death, Gurun Princess Hexiao's father-in-law, Heshen, was arrested on charges of corruption and political incompetence. Found guilty, Heshen was initially sentenced to death by slow slicing. However, the Jiaqing Emperor, who succeeded the Qianlong Emperor, permitted Heshen to commit suicide in his own residence out of respect for his tenth sister. Heshen's immense wealth, amassed over a long career of corrupt activities, were confiscated. The Jiaqing Emperor granted amnesty to Gurun Princess Hexiao and even granted her part of Heshen's confiscated property. Fengšeninde, on the other hand, was stripped of his privileges and titles but remained similarly unharmed.

Later life
In 1806, the Jiaqing Emperor sent Fengšeninde to Uliastai to serve as a military official. Fengšeninde fell ill after serving there for some time. Gurun Princess Hexiao begged the Jiaqing Emperor to allow them to return to Beijing. The Emperor agreed. Fengšeninde returned to Beijing in February 1810 and was enfeoffed as the "Duke of Jin" (晋公). He died three months later in May, leaving Gurun Princess Hexiao widowed.

After Fengšeninde's death, Gurun Princess Hexiao raised his two daughters (both born to his concubine), who were 11 and five years old respectively when their father died. She was financially stable; the Jiaqing Emperor made the Imperial Household Department ensure that she was well taken care of. Gurun Princess Hexiao died on 13 October 1823 during the reign of the Jiaqing Emperor's successor, the Daoguang Emperor. The cost of her funeral, paid for by the Imperial Household Department, amounted to about 5,000 silver taels.

Ancestry

In fiction and popular culture
 Portrayed by Ng Tsi-yin in The Rise and Fall of Qing Dynasty (1988)
 Portrayed by Stephanie Ho in Succession War (2018)

References 

1775 births
1823 deaths
Qing dynasty princesses
People from Beijing
Qianlong Emperor
18th-century Chinese women
18th-century Chinese people
19th-century Chinese women
19th-century Chinese people
Daughters of emperors